Adamgarh Hills is located in the Narmadapuram town of the Narmadapuram district in the Indian state of Madhya Pradesh.

Importance

Adamgarh Hills are famous for the pre-historic rock shelters and rock paintings found in the hills. Stone age artefacts, lower palaeolithic and mesolithic implements have been excavated here.

Neolithic paintings were found during the research and excavation done during the 19th century. There are now 11 visible shelters out of 18 shelters found during the excavation.

Location
Adamgarh Hills are located 2 km southeast to the Narmadapuram city.

Transport
Narmadapuram is well connected by road and train. Nearest major Railway station is in Itarsi.

See also
Itarsi
Bhopal
Narmadapuram
Madhya Pradesh

References

Villages in Narmadapuram district
Tourist attractions in Narmadapuram district